This is a list of ambassadors of the United States to Eswatini (formerly Swaziland).

By direction of King Mswati III, the English language form of his country's name was changed from Swaziland to Eswatini in 2018. Diplomatic missions were officially notified of this new name on May 18, 2018, and the U.S. Board on Geographic Names approved the new country name "Eswatini" (short-form) or "Kingdom of Eswatini" (long-form) on May 25, 2018 for U.S. government communications and documentation.

After the Second Boer War of 1899–1902, Swaziland became a British protectorate and thus came under the hegemony of the British Empire. In the early years of colonial rule, the British had expected that Swaziland would eventually be incorporated into South Africa. After World War II, however, South Africa’s racial policies induced the United Kingdom to prepare Swaziland for independence. In 1966, the UK Government agreed to discuss a new constitution, and Swaziland became independent on September 6, 1968.

The United States immediately recognized the new nation and established an embassy in the capital Mbabane on September 6, 1968, independence day for Swaziland. Chris C. Pappas, Jr., was appointed as chargé d'affaires ad interim pending the appointment of an ambassador. The first ambassador, Charles J. Nelson was appointed on June 9, 1971. He was accredited to Swaziland, Lesotho, and Botswana while resident in Gaborone, Botswana.

Ambassadors

Note: Chris C. Pappas, Jr. served as chargé d'affaires September 1968–April 1969. Robert W. Chase served in that capacity, April 1969–August 1971.

Notes

See also
Eswatini–United States relations
Foreign relations of Eswatini
Ambassadors of the United States

References
United States Department of State: Background notes on Eswatini

External links
 United States Department of State: Chiefs of Mission for Swaziland
 United States Department of State: Eswatini
 United States Embassy in The Gables

Eswatini
 
United States